Palu'e (also spelled Palue and Paluqe; native name ) is a Malayo-Polynesian language spoken on Palu'e Island, Indonesia.

Phonology

Vowels

Consonants

References

Further reading
Danerek, Stefan. (2019). "Phonologic variation in Palu’e, a language from Eastern Indonesia, and the divising of an orthographic system". Ethnorema (15). DOI: 10.23814/ethn.15.19.dan. https://www.ethnorema.it/en/journal/
Danerek, Stefan. (2019). Kamus Bahasa Palu'e-Indonesia. Depok. UI Publishing. . Review by Nazarudin (2020). Wacana. 21:3:496-498. http://wacana.ui.ac.id/index.php/wjhi/article/view/983/pdf_141

External links
 Stefan Danerek Palu’e audio collection. Kaipuleohone, the digital language archive of the University of Hawai‘i, Honolulu.

Sumba languages
Languages of Indonesia